In the Parliament of Australia, the Leader of the House is the government minister responsible for the management of government business in the House of Representatives, including the order in which the Government's agenda is to be dealt with, tactical matters in reaction to impediments to such management, negotiation with the Opposition's counterpart (the Manager of Opposition Business in the House) about the order in which bills are to be debated, and the time allotted for debates. The position is currently held by Tony Burke since June 2022.

As the Australian Parliament is bicameral, the Leader of the House must also be aware of developments in the Senate, for example, in order to anticipate whether a bill may be returned to the House with amendments.

The office was created in 1951 by the Prime Minister at the time, Robert Menzies. The Leader of the House and the Deputy Leader are appointed by the Prime Minister. The duties of the Deputy Leader of the House are largely contingent, coming into play only when the Leader of the House is absent from the House or is on leave, when they are referred to as Acting Leader of the House.

On 31 May 2022, Prime Minister Anthony Albanese announced a new ministry which saw Tony Burke become the Leader of the House and Mark Butler become the Deputy Leader of the House. Before their appointments, Burke and Butler were the Manager of Opposition Business and Deputy Manager respectively.

List of Leaders of the House
The following individuals have been appointed as Leader of the Australian House of Representatives:

Note: For terms during the period 1951 to 1972, exact dates are taken from changes in Prime Minister. Other dates coincide with sitting periods of the House as an approximation of when terms began and ended.

See also
Leader of Government Business (disambiguation)

References

 
Lists of political office-holders in Australia
 
Politics of Australia